Commoners Crown is the seventh studio album by British folk rock band Steeleye Span, released in 1975 by Chrysalis Records. It was their second album with the band's most commercially successful line-up. The album reached number 21 in the UK album charts.

The album's title refers to a sculpture produced by Shirtsleeves Studio, which appears on the cover of the album.  The sculpture is composed of hundreds of tiny human figures assembled to form a crown.  The tiny figures also decorate the liner notes.

Description
By this point, the band had evolved into a full-fledged rock sound, comparable to Jethro Tull during its folk rock phase.  Several of the tracks feature strong rock drumming and heavy guitar riffs, but the material remains almost entirely traditional folk music, with the exception of 'Bach Goes to Limerick', a surprising  attempt to interweave a classical Bach violin piece with a traditional Irish fiddle piece.

The lead track, 'Little Sir Hugh' is based on a medieval song about Little Saint Hugh of Lincoln, a 13th-century boy supposedly murdered by Jews.  The original song's lyrics are sharply and purposely anti-Semitic, but the band removed all the anti-Semitic elements.

In addition to 'Little Sir Hugh', the album includes 'Long Lankin', the band's longest song to date and something of a fan favourite, and 'Demon Lover'.

'New York Girls'
The band continued the whimsical streak demonstrated on Now We Are Six by inviting comedian and actor Peter Sellers to play the ukulele on the closing track, 'New York Girls'.  The band decided that it wanted a ukulele on the song, but no one in the band knew anyone who played the instrument.  Finally someone remarked that Sellers was known to play it competently, and they decided to approach him to appear on the song, even though none of them knew him at all.  To their surprise, he agreed, and the song became one of only two recordings he made with a rock band. The other was 'After the Fox', recorded with The Hollies in 1966 for the film of the same title.

Sellers also contributed some vocals spoken in character as Henry Crun and Minnie Bannister (originally portrayed by Sellers and Spike Milligan in the BBC radio comedy programme, The Goon Show). Many fans of the band found this distracting. On the original vinyl release, the song ended with Sellers saying "I say, are you a matelot? Careful what you say, sir – we're on board ship here." Subsequent CD releases omitted the quip, until 2009 when the 3-disc EMI box set A Parcel of Steeleye Span reinstated it.

The song is also unusual in that all the male band members (except Nigel Pegrum) take lead vocals on two verses each (Rick Kemp singing verses 1 and 5, Tim Hart 2 and 6, Peter Knight 3 and 7 and Bob Johnson 4 and 8). Maddy Prior sings the chorus. Despite this odd note, 'Commoner's Crown' is often cited as one of the band's best efforts.

Track listing
"Little Sir Hugh" (Traditional) – 4:44
"Bach Goes To Limerick" (Hart, Johnson, Kemp, Knight, Pegrum, Prior) – 3:41
"Long Lankin" (Traditional) – 8:40
"Dogs and Ferrets" (Traditional) – 2:43
"Galtee Farmer" (Traditional) – 3:47
"Demon Lover" (Traditional) – 5:54
"Elf Call" (Traditional) – 3:54
"Weary Cutters" (Traditional) – 2:04
"New York Girls" (Traditional) – 3:12

Personnel
Steeleye Span
Maddy Prior - vocals
Tim Hart - vocals, guitar, appalachian dulcimer
Bob Johnson - vocals, guitar
Rick Kemp - bass guitar, drums
Peter Knight - violin
Nigel Pegrum - drums, flute

Guest musician
Peter Sellers - ukulele on "New York Girls"

1975 albums
Chrysalis Records albums
Steeleye Span albums
Albums recorded at Morgan Sound Studios